Mordechai "Moti" Haim is a former Israeli footballer, musician and actor who played for Maccabi Jaffa and Maccabee Los Angeles.

Early life 
Haim was born in 1954. He grew up on Jerusalem Boulevard in Jaffa, Israel. He started playing for Maccabi Jaffa's youth team at the age of 10.

Career
Haim started playing for Maccabi Jaffa's senior team and became a regular player. Highlights of his career include playing in the UEFA Intertoto Cup in 1977.

He completed military service with the Israel Defense Forces, where he was a drummer in an IDF band. He later joined the famous 'Tzadikov Choir' as a drummer, performing alongside Oshik Levi. After this, Haim moved to Maccabee Los Angeles, which was at that time a semi-professional team. After two years in LA, he returned to Israel and again played for Maccabi Jaffa.

Haim relocated to the United States permanently in 1980.

Haim was a member of a band, Rockinhaim, with his wife Donna and their three children. The couple later went into real estate together in Los Angeles.

In 2021, he made his acting debut in Paul Thomas Anderson's Licorice Pizza, where he played the father of Alana, played by his own daughter Alana Haim.

Honours

 Israeli Premier League - Runner-up: 1976-1977

Filmography

Personal life
He is the father of Este Haim (b. 1986), Danielle Haim (b. 1989), and Alana Haim (b. 1991), who went on to form the Los Angeles-based pop rock band Haim. His maternal family is of Bulgarian-Jewish descent.

References

1954 births
Living people
Israeli Jews
Israeli footballers
Maccabi Jaffa F.C. players
Liga Leumit players
Israeli people of Bulgarian-Jewish descent
Association footballers not categorized by position
Israeli expatriate footballers
Expatriate soccer players in the United States
Israeli expatriate sportspeople in the United States